This is a list of diplomatic missions of Palau, and it also includes a list of the Palauan Consulates.

The Republic of Palau, a small Pacific island state in a Compact of Free Association with the United States, only has a small number of diplomatic missions and consulates.

Individual countries
This is a list of Palauan embassies and consulates:

International organizations
This is a list of Palauan missions to international organizations:

Gallery

See also
 Foreign relations of Palau
 List of diplomatic missions in Palau

References
 Official list of Diplomatic Mission of Republic of Palau
 United States Department of the Interior - Office of Insular Affairs

Notes

Palau
Diplomatic missions